Fashion is a 2008 Indian drama film directed by Madhur Bhandarkar and produced by UTV Motion Pictures. The film features Priyanka Chopra in the lead role, with Kangana Ranaut, Mugdha Godse, Arbaaz Khan and Arjan Bajwa in supporting roles as well as several professional fashion models playing themselves. Bhandarkar co-wrote the film with Ajay Monga and Anuraadha Tewari. Deven Murdeshwar edited the film  while the cinematography was provided by Mahesh Limaye. Salim–Sulaiman composed the musical score, with lyrics written by Irfan Siddiqui and Sandeep Nath. The film focuses on the transformation of Meghna Mathur, an aspiring fashion model played by Chopra, from a small-town girl to a supermodel in the Indian fashion industry.

It grossed  and was noted for being commercially successful despite being a women-centric film with no male lead. Fashion received various awards and nominations, with praise for its direction, the performance of the cast, screenplay, editing, musical score, and costume design.

At the 56th National Film Awards, Chopra and Ranaut won the awards for Best Actress and  Best Supporting Actress respectively. The film received seven nominations at the 54th Filmfare Awards, including Best Director for Bhandarkar and Best Screenplay for Bhandarkar, Monga, and Tewari. Chopra and Ranaut also won the Filmfare Award for Best Actress and Best Supporting Actress respectively. Chopra won the Best Actress Award at the 15th Screen Awards, while Ranaut and Godse were nominated for Best Supporting Actress. At the 2009 Star Guild Awards, Chopra, Ranaut and Godse won the Best Actress in a Leading Role, Best Actress in a Supporting Role and Best Female Debut respectively. The film garnered six nominations at the 2009 Stardust Awards, including Best Film and Best Director for Bhandarkar.

Accolades

See also
 List of Bollywood films of 2008

Footnotes

References

External links
 Accolades for Fashion at the Internet Movie Database

Lists of accolades by Indian film